Laura Attard (born 10 September 1986) is an Australian rules footballer who played for the Carlton Football Club in the AFL Women's competition (AFLW). She was drafted by Carlton with the club's eighteenth selection and the one hundred and fortieth overall in the 2016 AFL Women's draft. She made her debut in Round 1, 2017, in the club and the league's inaugural match at Ikon Park against . Attard finished 2017 having played in all seven of Carlton's matches that season. She was delisted by Carlton at the end of the 2018 season.

References

External links

Living people
1986 births
Carlton Football Club (AFLW) players
Australian rules footballers from Victoria (Australia)
Sportswomen from Victoria (Australia)
Victorian Women's Football League players